Nicolas Jamin (born December 5, 1995) is a French racing driver who currently competes in the European Le Mans Series with United Autosports.

Open Wheel Racing

F2000

Jamin made his professional debut in the 2014 U.S. F2000 National Championship with Belardi Auto Racing and Pabst Racing Services. He returned in 2015 in the U.S. F2000 National Championship with Cape Motorsports Wayne Taylor Racing. He then won ten of the fifteen races in the 2015 season on his way to the title. He finished on the podium in every race except one, earning an automatic promotion to the Pro Mazda Championship in 2016.

Pro Mazda

Jamin scored two wins and six podiums in his debut season in the Pro Mazda Championship, finishing third in the standings.  After being scouted by Andretti Autosport during an end of season test, he was signed to drive in the Indy Lights championship for them in 2017.

Indy Lights

Jamin joined Andretti Autosport for the 2017 Indy Lights season and recorded his first win in April at Barber Motorsports Park.

Sports Car Racing
Jamin joined ANSA Motorsports in 2017 for his first LMP3 experience in the IMSA Prototype Challenge series (formerly IMSA Lites), where he won both races of his debut weekend at Sebring International Raceway.

Jamin made his first-ever Pirelli World Challenge start in 2017 at Virginia International Raceway where he swept the weekend, winning both races in the GTS class, driving a KTM X-Bow GT4 for ANSA Motorsports. After previously appearing for AKKA ASP Team in the GT World Challenge Europe in 2018, Jamin returned to the series in 2023, taking part in a Bronze Cup entry for AGS Events alongside Antonin Borga and Leonardo Gorini.

Racing record

Career summary

† As he was a guest driver, Jamin was ineligible to score points.

American open-wheel racing results

U.S. F2000 National Championship

Pro Mazda Championship

Indy Lights

Complete Blancpain GT Series Sprint Cup results

Complete European Le Mans Series results

‡ Half points awarded as less than 75% of race distance was completed.

Complete FIA World Endurance Championship results
(key) (Races in bold indicate pole position; races in italics indicate fastest lap)

Complete 24 Hours of Le Mans results

References

External links
 
 

1995 births
Living people
French racing drivers
U.S. F2000 National Championship drivers
Indy Lights drivers
Sportspeople from Rouen
People from Coconut Creek, Florida
24 Hours of Le Mans drivers
European Le Mans Series drivers
Indy Pro 2000 Championship drivers
French F4 Championship drivers
FIA World Endurance Championship drivers
Formula Renault Eurocup drivers
Formula Renault 2.0 NEC drivers
Blancpain Endurance Series drivers
24 Hours of Spa drivers
Auto Sport Academy drivers
Belardi Auto Racing drivers
Wayne Taylor Racing drivers
Andretti Autosport drivers
United Autosports drivers
AV Formula drivers
Formula Renault 2.0 Alps drivers
R-ace GP drivers
ART Grand Prix drivers
Tech 1 Racing drivers